Several ships of the French Navy have borne the name Embuscade:
 Embuscade (1670), renamed Dangereux in 1677, then restored to Embuscade later in 1677. Re-classed as fireship 1677 and sold in 1688.
 Embuscade (1704), captured in May 1707 by the Royal Navy.
 Embuscade (1745), captured in 1746 and renamed HMS Ambuscade.  She was sold at Deptford in 1762.
 , a frigate captured in 1799, later renamed HMS Seine when the previous Ambuscade was recaptured in 1803. She was broken up in 1813.
 Embuscade (1798), HMS Ambuscade captured by the French corvette  in 1798 and renamed Embuscade.  She was recaptured by the British in 1803 and broken up in 1810.
 Embuscade (1865), a floating battery stricken in 1885.

French Navy ship names